Rubrotricha is a genus of lichen-forming fungi in the family Gomphillaceae. It is a monospecific genus, containing the single species Rubrotricha helminthospora.

References

Ostropales
Lichen genera
Ostropales genera
Taxa described in 2005
Taxa named by Antonín Vězda
Taxa named by Emmanuël Sérusiaux
Taxa named by Robert Lücking